Sir Robert Baxter Llewelyn  (1845–1919) was a colonial administrator in the British Empire.

Appointments
 1878-1883: Commissioner of the Turks and Caicos Islands
 1885-1888: Governor of Tobago 
 1886-1889: Administrator of Saint Vincent and the Grenadines
 1889-1891: Commissioner of Saint Lucia
 1891-1900: Administrator of the Colony of the Gambia
 7 November 1900 – 1906: Governor and Commander-in-Chief of the Windward Islands and their dependencies
 1900-1906: Governor of Grenada

During his time as the Governor of the Windward Isles Llewelyn oversaw the response to the 1902 eruption of La Soufriere Volcano on St. Vincent. On the morning of the climactic eruption he left the island of St. Vincent (his usual residence) for a meeting in St. Lucia, but made some observations of activity as his ship sailed past, and later returned. This impacted trust in his governance around recovery and response to further explosions. He later returned £33,000 of the £77,000 raised for relief efforts as decision-making around this was slow and acrimonious. The needs of the refugee populations were not met, and many were encouraged to move overseas for employment.

References 

1919 deaths
1845 births
Knights Commander of the Order of St Michael and St George
Governors of British Tobago
Governors of the Turks and Caicos Islands
Governors of British Saint Lucia
Governors of British Saint Vincent and the Grenadines
Governors of the Gambia
Governors of the Windward Islands
Governors of British Grenada